Hisonotus chromodontus is a species of catfish in the family Loricariidae. It is native to Brazil, where it occurs in the Tapajós basin. The species is usually found in shallow flat parts of creeks with clear water, low current, and sandy substrate. It reaches 3.3 cm (1.3 inches) SL.

References 

Otothyrinae
Fish described in 2007